Welbeck Abbey in the Dukeries in North Nottinghamshire was the site of a monastery belonging to the Premonstratensian order in England and after the Dissolution of the Monasteries, a country house residence of the Dukes of Portland. It is one of four contiguous ducal estates in North Nottinghamshire and the house is a grade I listed building.

History
The estate was mentioned in the Domesday Book, where it is recorded as belonging to Hugh fitzBaldric. Thomas de Cuckney founded the religious house in 1140. It was an abbey of Premonstratensian canons, dedicated to St James the Great. The abbey was enriched by gifts from the Goushills, D’Eyncourts, Bassets, and other families from Nottinghamshire and it received a considerable grant from King Edward I.

In 1393 the abbey came under serious investigation by King Richard II. 
Pardon to William Broun of Norton by Welbeck of suit of the King’s peace for felonies, treasons and other offences under the following circumstances: Robert Veel, keeper of the rolls of the King’s Bench, and John Wynchecombe, appointed by the king to take carts for the carriage of the rolls, being directed on Saturday before the feast of St Katherine last by Walter Clopton, Chief Justice, and other justices to carry the said rolls from York to Nottingham, where upon by reason of excessive rainfall affecting the roads, they could not without additional horses reach Nottingham, where upon by virtue of their commission and the justices order they took at Norton aforesaid two horses of John Levet and John Turnour of Norton, to be paid for in due course. There upon the said William Broun, John Northeryn, Robert Bocher, all of Norton, and Hugh Matt, servant of John Baukwell, Abbot of Welbeck, with divers other evil doers came armed with bows and arrows, sticks and swords, and at dusk of the same day raised all the men of Norton to insurrection, pursued the said Robert and John to Warsop and instigated by Simon de Castleton, canon of Welbeck, and John Worsop, vicar of Cuckney and canon of Welbeck, assaulted them, shot at and pierced the books in the carriage and took the horses, and would have carried the same away but that by the grace of God and their help they made too good a defence.

With so much wealth at his disposal, the Abbot of Welbeck was an influential man, and in 1512 all the houses of the order in England were placed under his care. In 1538, the abbot, Richard Bentley was awarded a pension of £50 (equivalent to £ as of ),, and the 17 canons received pensions of between £40 (equivalent to £ as of ) and £4 (equivalent to £ as of ) a year.

At the Dissolution of the Monasteries, the site was granted by King Henry VIII to Richard Whalley, of Screveton. After being owned by a City of London clothier, the abbey was purchased by Gilbert, 7th Earl of Shrewsbury for the sum of £555 6s 6d (equivalent to £ as of ) in 1599, and sold to Sir Charles Cavendish, son of Bess of Hardwick in 1607.  It passed to his son William Cavendish, later first Duke of Newcastle; it became the seat of the dukes. Members of the Cavendish family converted it into a country house and added a riding house in the 17th century to the design of Robert Smythson and his son John.  Only basements and inner walls were retained from the original fabric of the old abbey buildings. In the 18th century, it passed through an heiress into the Bentinck family and became the seat of the Earls and Dukes of Portland.

Modern history

One of the oldest parts of the building, the Oxford Wing, burned down in October 1900; most of the contents were saved. The wing was rebuilt, to the designs of Ernest George, by 1905.

Archduke Franz Ferdinand accepted an invitation from the 6th Duke of Portland to stay at Welbeck Abbey and arrived with his wife, Sophie von Hohenberg, by train at Worksop on 22 November 1913 ten months before his assassination, which triggered World War I. The Archduke narrowly avoided being killed in a hunting accident during his stay when a loader fell and caused a shotgun to go off within feet of the Archduke and his host.

Over the course of the War between 1914 and 1919, the kitchen block was used as an army hospital. After World War II, Welbeck was let by the Dukes to the Ministry of Defence and was operated as Welbeck College, an army training college, until 2005, when the college, since closed, moved to a purpose-built facility at Woodhouse Eaves near Loughborough.  Bill Bryson describes his visit to the Abbey while it was occupied by the Ministry of Defence in Chapter 15 of his book Notes from a Small Island.

Lady Anne, the unmarried elder daughter of the 7th Duke, lived at Welbeck Woodhouse, and owned most of the  estate until her death in late 2008 when William Henry Marcello Parente (born 1951) inherited, son of her younger sister, Lady Margaret (1918–1955) and her husband Gaetano Parente, Prince of Castel Viscardo. Since the Ministry of Defence moved out in 2005, Welbeck Abbey has been his home.

The family-controlled Welbeck Estates Company and the charitable Harley Foundation have converted some estate buildings to new uses, and there is access to them from the A60 road on the western side of the estate. They include the Dukeries Garden Centre in the estate glasshouses, the School of Artisan Food in the former Fire Stables, the Harley Gallery and Foundation and the Welbeck Farm shop in the former estate gasworks, and a range of craft workshops, designed by John Outram in a former kitchen garden. Pedestrian access across the Welbeck estate is confined to footpaths forming part of the Robin Hood Way.

The first No Direction Home Festival was held at Welbeck Abbey over the weekend of 8 to 10 June 2012. The End of the Road affiliated festival was headlined by Richard Hawley, The Low Anthem and Andrew Bird.

In 2016 it was used as the location for the BBC's baking series Bake Off: Crème de la Crème.

Architecture

The 5th Duke of Portland undertook  the most substantial building works at Welbeck. The kitchen gardens covered  and were surrounded by high walls with recesses in which braziers could be placed to hasten the ripening of fruit. An immense riding house was built which was 396' long, 108' wide and 50' high,'At the time it was the second largest riding house in the world, exceeded only by the huge Manege adjacent to the Kremlin in Moscow'. It was lit by 4,000 gas jets and was heated to enable training at night and in winter. The 'Tan Gallops' is named after the spongy oak chips that covered its floor. They were a by-product from leather tanning and a good surface for the horses to run on.
	 
A tunnel, more than one thousand yards in length, led from the house to the riding school. It was wide enough for several people to walk side by side. Parallel to it was another, more roughly constructed and used by workmen. A longer, more elaborate tunnel, one and a half miles long, intended as a carriage drive broad enough for two carriages to pass, led towards Worksop. This tunnel was abandoned in the late 19th century when a section forming part of the lake dam failed. Remaining stretches of tunnel survive on either side of the lake. The tunnel's skylights can be seen from the Robin Hood Way footpath which follows its course and a masonry entrance can be seen between two lodges at the northeastern limit of the park.
	 
The 5th Duke excavated to create a number of extensions to the mansion. Although cited as being "underground rooms", these apartments are strictly "below ground", as they are not covered by earth or lawn; their flat roofs and skylights are visible in aerial photographs, although at ground level they are concealed from most directions by shrubbery. There is a suite of five adjacent rooms constructed to house the duke's library. 
	 
The duke made many alterations to the house above ground. Elaborate bathrooms were added. New lodges were built at the park entrances.
	 
The work cost prodigious sums and employed thousands of men – masons, bricklayers, joiners, plumbers. While there were disputes from time to time (wages, hours) the duke got on well with his employees and earned the nickname 'the workman's friend'. He created employment for skilled and unskilled workers.

By 1879 Welbeck was in a state of disrepair. The only habitable rooms were the four or five rooms used by the 5th Duke in the west wing. All were painted pink, with parquet floors, all bare and without furniture and almost every room had a water closet in the corner.

The house was repaired by the 6th Duke, and became notable as a centre of late Victorian and Edwardian upper-class society.  The duke was a keen horse-owner, and almhouses he constructed on the estate are known as the Winnings, funded by money won by his horses in seven high purse races from 1888 to 1890.

The abbey, its attached picture gallery and the chapel and library are listed Grade I on the National Heritage List for England, and its surrounding landscaped park is listed Grade II on the Register of Historic Parks and Gardens.

The two pairs of lodges flanking the north and south drives respectively are each listed Grade II*. The grotto is listed Grade II as is the sunken garden and rose arbor. The Chapel and Titchfield Library are listed Grade I.

Welbeck Woodhouse
A smaller house known as Welbeck Woodhouse was built on the northern side of the estate for the Marquess of Titchfield (the courtesy title held by the 7th Duke prior to his succession to the Dukedom) in 1930–31. This was built to a design by Walter Brierley but executed after Brierley's death by his partner James Hervey Rutherford. This house was subsequently the main home of the Cavendish-Bentinck family on the estate when the main house was leased to the MoD.

List of owners and occupiers
 ca 1086 Hugh FitzBaldric
 1140 – 1538 Premonstratensian canons in the Abbey of St. James

Abbots of Welbeck Abbey

 Berengar, occurs between 1153 and 1169
 Adam, occurs between 1183 and 1194
 Richard, occurs between 1194 and 1224
 William, occurs 1229, 1236, 1243
 Richard, occurs 1250, 1252, 1256–7
 Adam, occurs 1263, 1272, 1276
 Thomas, occurs 1281, 1292
 John de Duckmanton, 1309
 John de Cestrefeld, 1310
 William de Kendall, 1316
 John de Nottingham, 1322
 William de Aslakeden, 1335
 Robert Spalding, 1341
 John de Wirksop, 1349
 Hugh de Langley, 1360
 George de Gamelston, occurs 1369, 1383, 1387
 William de Staveley, occurs 1389
 John Bankwell, occurs 1393
 John de Norton, occurs 1412, dies 1450
 John Greene, 1450
 William Burton, occurs 1475, 1482
 John Lancaster alias Acastre, occurs 1488, 1491
 John Copper, occurs 1492
 Thomas Wydur, occurs 1494, 1497, 1500
 Robert, occurs 1502
 Thomas Wilkinson, 1503
 John Maxey, 1520, died 1536
 Richard Bentley, surrendered 1538

Private owners

 1538 – 1558 Richard Whalley of Screveton
 1558 – 1595 Edward Osborne of London, citizen and clothworker
 1595 – 1599 Robert Booth and Ranulph Catterall
 1599 – 1607 Gilbert Talbot, 7th Earl of Shrewsbury and Mary Talbot, Countess of Shrewsbury
 1607 – 1617 Sir Charles Cavendish
 1617 – 1676 William Cavendish, 1st Duke of Newcastle-upon-Tyne
 1676 – 1691 Henry Cavendish, 2nd Duke of Newcastle-upon-Tyne
 1691 – 1711 John Holles, 1st Duke of Newcastle-upon-Tyne and Lady Margaret Cavendish
 1711 – 1734 Edward Harley, 2nd Earl of Oxford and Earl Mortimer and Lady Henrietta Cavendish Holles
 1734 – 1785 William Bentinck, 2nd Duke of Portland and Margaret Bentinck, Duchess of Portland
 1785 – 1809 William Cavendish-Bentinck, 3rd Duke of Portland
 1809 – 1854 William Bentinck, 4th Duke of Portland
 1854 – 1879 William Cavendish-Scott-Bentinck, 5th Duke of Portland
 1879 – 1943 William John Arthur Charles James Cavendish-Bentinck, 6th Duke of Portland
 1943 – 1977 William Arthur Henry Cavendish-Bentinck, 7th Duke of Portland and Ivy Cavendish-Bentinck, Duchess of Portland
 1943 – 2005 The Ministry of Defence leased most of the abbey from the 7th Duke and his successors
 1977 – 2008 Lady Anne Cavendish-Bentinck
 1992 – present William Parente, a grandson of the 7th Duke and a nephew of Lady Anne; he served as High Sheriff of Nottinghamshire for 2003–2004. He is Prince of Castel Viscardo in Italy.

References

External links

History of Welbeck Abbey from Worksop Heritage Trail
Country Life article about Welbeck Abbey (1906)
 Welbeck Abbey entry from The DiCamillo Companion to British & Irish Country Houses
Jacks, The Great Houses of Nottinghamshire
The Harley Gallery
Welbeck Farm Shop
Historic Photos of Welbeck Abbey

1140 establishments in England
1538 disestablishments in England
Bassetlaw District
Bolsover District
Christian monasteries established in the 12th century
The Dukeries
Ernest George buildings
Gardens by Humphry Repton
Grade I listed churches in Nottinghamshire
Grade I listed houses
Grade II listed buildings in Nottinghamshire
Grade II listed parks and gardens in Nottinghamshire
Monasteries dissolved under the English Reformation
Monasteries in Nottinghamshire
Premonstratensian monasteries in England
Religious organizations established in the 1140s
Tunnels in England
Bentinck family